is a Japanese actress.

Career
Fukumi Kuroda appeared in the films such as Shohei Imamura's History of Postwar Japan as Told by a Bar Hostess, Juzo Itami's Tampopo, and Kiyoshi Kurosawa's Sweet Home.

Filmography

Film
 Tampopo (1985) - Man in White Suit's mistress
 Sweet Home (1989) - Asuka
 Zansatsu Seyo Setsunaki Mono, Sore wa Ai (1990)
 Tales of a Golden Geisha (1990) - Kiyoka a geisha
 Shirayuri Gakuen Yokyubu (1992)
 Ahiru no Uta ga Kikoete Kuruyo (1993) - 'Yamanashi-Ya' no tsuma
 It's a Summer Vacation Everyday (1994) - Mrs. Kobayashi
 Karaoke (1999)
 Dodge Go! Go! (2002) - Headmaster
 Lakeside Murder Case (2004) - Kazue Fujima
 Sunshine Days (2008)
 Zero Focus (2009)
 Tôku no sora (2010)
 Banana to gurôbu to jinbeezame (2013) - Mariko domoto
 Tokyo teyande (2013)
 Reason of Life (2015) - Yoshimi Tachibana
 Shasen Henkō (TBA)

Television
 Dengeki Sentai Changeman (1985-1986) - Queen Ahames
 The Kindaichi Case Files (1995)
 Tsukisoibito no Uta (1998) - Sakazaki (head nurse)
 Stained Glass (2004)
 Muscle Girl! (2011) - Lee Soon-Ja

References

External links
 
 

1956 births
Actresses from Tokyo
Living people
Japanese actresses
People from Tokyo